Col de la Bonette (el. ) is a high mountain pass in the French Alps, near the border with Italy. It is situated within the Mercantour National Park on the border of the departments of Alpes-Maritimes and Alpes-de-Haute-Provence. The road over the col is the seventh highest paved road in the Alps.

Col de Restefond
The passage over the Col de la Bonette is often mistakenly referred to as the Col de Restefond, and in the 2008 Tour de France the summit was referred to as the Cime de la Bonette-Restefond. On the descent to Jausiers, the actual Col de Restefond was then passed on the right approximately 1 km from the summit.

“Highest road in Europe”
The two kilometre long teardrop shaped loop around the Cime de la Bonette peak from either side of the pass is the highest paved through route in the Alps.

A signpost at the foot of the climb makes the claim "Col de la Bonette – Restefond, 2802 m above sea level, highest road in Europe". This claim is incorrect for various reasons. There is also the road to Veleta (Sierra Nevada), Spain (near Granada) which reaches  but it is not a through road.

It is, however, the highest asphalted road in France and is the highest through road in Europe.

Details of the climb

On the climb to the actual Col de la Bonette, there is one short section at over 10%, but on the loop around the Cime de la Bonette, the gradient reaches 15%.

On both sides mountain pass cycling markers are placed every kilometre. They indicate the current height, the distance from the start, the distance to the summit, the average slope in the following kilometre, the number of the street, as well as the distances to villages and cities connected by the pass. They provide information for cyclists going up- and downhill.

Tour de France

The pass has featured in the Tour de France four times (1962, 1964, 1993 and 2008). In 1962 and 1964, the race was led over the summit in both years by Federico Bahamontes, approaching from the south in 1962 and from the north in 1964. Robert Millar led over the summit (from the north) in 1993.

In 2008 John-Lee Augustyn led over the mountain (from the south), before falling on the descent to Jausiers.

Appearances in Tour de France

References

External links 

Preview of Bonette Stage in 2008 Tour de France    
Col de la Bonette cycling. Pictures and profiles 
Motorbiking in the Alps 
Map of the Col de la Bonette and the Col de Restefond
Col de la Bonette on Google Maps (Tour de France classic climbs)
Cycling up to the Col de la Bonette: data, profile, map, photos and description

Mercantour National Park
Mountain passes of the Alps
Landforms of Alpes-de-Haute-Provence
Landforms of Alpes-Maritimes
Mountain passes of Provence-Alpes-Côte d'Azur
Transport in Provence-Alpes-Côte d'Azur